The 2016 IIHF U18 World Championship Division I were a pair of international under-18 ice hockey tournaments organised by the International Ice Hockey Federation. The Division I A and Division I B tournaments represent the second and the third tier of the IIHF World U18 Championship.

Division I A

The Division I A tournament was played in Minsk, Belarus, from 9 to 15 April 2016.

Participants

Standings

Results

All times are local. (Further-eastern European Time – UTC+3)

Statistics and awards

Scoring leaders 
GP = Games played; G = Goals; A = Assists; Pts = Points; +/− = Plus-minus; PIM = Penalties In Minutes
Source: IIHF.com

Goaltending leaders 

(minimum 40% team's total ice time)

TOI = Time on ice (minutes:seconds); SA = Shots against; GA = Goals against; GAA = Goals against average; Sv% = Save percentage; SO = Shutouts

Source: IIHF.com

IIHF best player awards
 Goaltender:  Mirko Pantkowski
 Defenceman:  Vladislav Martynyuk
 Forward:  Sayan Daniyar

Division I B

The Division I B tournament was played in Asiago, Italy, from 18 to 24 April 2016.

Participants

Standings

Results

All times are local. (Central European Summer Time – UTC+2)

Statistics and awards

Scoring leaders 

GP = Games played; G = Goals; A = Assists; Pts = Points; +/− = Plus-minus; PIM = Penalties In Minutes
Source: IIHF.com

Goaltending leaders 

(minimum 40% team's total ice time)

TOI = Time on ice (minutes:seconds); SA = Shots against; GA = Goals against; GAA = Goals against average; Sv% = Save percentage; SO = Shutouts

Source: IIHF.com

IIHF best player awards

 Goaltender:  David Mark Kovacs
 Defenceman:  Junki Shinoda
 Forward:  Jan Drozg

References

2016 IIHF World U18 Championships
2016
International ice hockey competitions hosted by Belarus
International ice hockey competitions hosted by Italy
2016
Sport in Veneto
April 2016 sports events in Europe
2015–16 in Belarusian ice hockey
2015–16 in Italian ice hockey